Vincent House may refer to:

One of the houses in Burton–Judson Courts at the University of Chicago.
Vincent House (Fort Dodge, Iowa)
William H. Vincent House, Capron, Virginia